Sha Tin Rural Committee is a rural committee representing the interest of villages in Sha Tin District, Hong Kong.

Sha Tin District
Rural Committees